Tengku Zulpuri Shah bin Raja Puji (Jawi: تڠكو ذوالڤوري شاه بن راج ڤوجي) (born 15 July 1964) is a Malaysian politician who has served as Member of the Pahang State Legislative Assembly (MLA) for Tras since November 2022. He served as Deputy Minister of Water, Land and Natural Resources in the Pakatan Harapan (PH) administration under former Prime Minister Mahathir Mohamad and former Minister Xavier Jayakumar Arulanandam from July 2018 to the collapse of the PH administration in February 2020 and the Member of Parliament (MP) for Raub from May 2018 to November 2022, State Leader of the Opposition of Pahang and the MLA for Mentakab from May 2013 to May 2018 and member of the Selayang Municipal Council (MPS). He is a member of the Democratic Action Party (DAP), a component party of the PH coalition. He has served as the Deputy Secretary-General of DAP since March 2022 and is the State Deputy Chairman of Pahang of DAP. He also served as the National Vice Chairman of DAP from November 2017 to March 2022. In addition, he was the sole Malay MP of DAP from 2018 to 2022.

Political career

Appointment as Deputy Secretary-general of DAP 
On 20 March 2022, on the 17th DAP National Congress, Zulpuri Shah was appointed as Deputy Secretary-general of DAP serving together with V. Sivakumar and Liew Chin Tong under Secretary-general, Anthony Loke.

Personal life 
He is also a member of the Pahang royal family and son of Tengku Puji Tengku Abdul Hamid, former Deputy Commissioner of Pahang and former committee member of the Malaysian Islamic Party (PAS).

Election results

References 

Living people
People from Pahang
Malaysian people of Malay descent
Malaysian people of Bugis descent
Malaysian Muslims
Democratic Action Party (Malaysia) politicians
Members of the Dewan Rakyat
Members of the Pahang State Legislative Assembly
Royal House of Pahang
21st-century Malaysian politicians
1964 births